Khanom chin are fresh, thin rice noodles in Thai cuisine which are made from rice sometimes fermented for three days, boiled, and then made into noodles by extruding the resulting dough through a sieve into boiling water. Khanom chin is served in many kinds of stock: coconut milk, fish curry, and chilli.  Although chin means "Chinese" in Thai, this type of noodle originated from the Mon people who inhabited the region which is now central Thailand The word khanom chin is probably derived from the Mon words hanom cin, or "boiled noodles."

These noodles are used as a staple food in a variety of Thai dishes. Some popular dishes are:
 Khanom chin nam ya, served with a hot and spicy fish-based sauce
 Khanom chin nam phrik, served with a sweet peanut-based sauce
 Khanom chin kaeng kiao wan kai, served with green chicken curry
 Khanom chin nam ngiao, a northern Thai speciality, the sauce contains pork blood
 Khanom chin sao nam, a salad with coconut milk, ground sun-dried prawns, and fresh pineapple
 Khanom chin tai pla, a southern Thai spicy soup
 Khanom chin miang pla, noodles with deep fried fish and spicy chili sauce wrapped in a big salad leaf

Another popular combination is to serve Thai papaya salad together with this noodle.

There are two types of khanom chin noodles:

Khanom chin noodles made with fermented flour, usually made in the northeast. The brown noodle is stickier than fresh flour and can keep for a long time. This is the ancient method of khanom chin making.
Khanom chin noodle made with fresh flour. The noodles are bigger than fermented flour and softer too. Khanom chin noodle is white and easy to make.
 
Similar noodles are also found in other cuisines: mont di from Burmese cuisine; mi xian is from Yunnan Province, China; num banhchok from Cambodia; and bún from Vietnam. It also bears similarities to idiyappam, a rice noodle dish eaten in the southern Indian states of Tamil Nadu and Kerala and also eaten in Sri Lanka, Malaysia, Singapore and Indonesia.

Eating khanom chin
When khanom chin is served, the stock is added. Each locality has a different stock such as coconut stock, fish, curry sauce, chili sauce, and curry with coconut milk such as green curry, spicy pork sauce, and fish organ sour soup. Moreover, for children, there is also a sweet stock without spices combined with nuts. 
 
Kanom chin is eaten with fresh vegetables and pickles as condiments. In the north, pickled cabbage and raw sprouts are typical. In the central region, banana blossoms, lentils, cucumbers, sprouts, raw papaya, basil, gotu kola, bitter melon, and morning glory. Another condiment is half-boiled egg and roasted peppers. In the northeast, fresh vegetables such as white popinac, climbing wattle, and parsley. In the south, fresh vegetables such as parkia, white popinac, olives, and pickles.

The neighborhoods are notable for the Kanom chin in Bangkok includes Banglampoo in Phra Nakhon, only here are two eateries. And another place is Wongwian Yai in Thonburi side.

Variations
Khanom chin nam ya is Thai for "noodles with fish curry." Khanom chin nam ya is spicy like many other dishes in Thai cuisine, such as Tomyamkung, Somtum, and yum. Nam ya (English: fish curry) originates from Central Thailand. The ingredients of khanom chin nam ya include khanom chin, boiled fish, fish ball, dried guinea pepper, salt, kha sliced, lemongrass sliced, garlic sliced, turmeric sliced, fingerroot, shrimp paste, shallots, undiluted coconut milk, diluted coconut milk, fish sauce, palm sugar, noodles, boiled egg and fresh vegetables. First, the dried guinea pepper, salt, kha, lemongrass, shallots, garlic, fingerroot and turmeric is pounded until it breaks, then boiled fish and shrimp paste are added and pounding is continued. Second, the coconut milk is boiled by using middle temperature, then the spices in the first step, when the coconut milk is boiling, then input fish ball and season. Lastly, khanom chin is added to the dish and fish curry is poured over the dish, it is ready to eat with boiled egg and fresh vegetables.

Khanom chin nam ngiao is a noodle soup or curry of the cuisine of the Tai Yai people who live in the northeast of Myanmar, the southwest of Yunnan province, China, and in northern Thailand, mainly in Mae Hong Son Province. The dish has become famous through the northern Thai cuisine. Nam ngiao has a characteristic spicy and tangy flavor.

Khanom chin kai khua  is Thai for  "noodles with stir-fried chicken." Khanom chin kai khua is similar to the Khanom chin nam ya. However, there is a difference in ingredients used minced chicken served with fried chili oil, chicken blood pudding, chopped onion and coriander. The dish is considered a rare food, it is made and sold only two places are Kudi Chin, which was a small community of Thai Portuguese located at the Chao Phraya River bank near Santa Cruz Church in Thonburi neighborhood, and the Ban Yuan near Immaculate Conception Church in Samsen neighborhood, which was community of Roman Catholic Thai Vietnamese.  Assumed that it originated from the Portuguese spaghetti white sauce. It is also called Khanom chin Portugal. (although, some academic believe that it was originated from Khmer cuisine)

Khanom chin Pradok or Khanom chin Ban Pradok is famous and popular in Nakhon Ratchasima Province or Korat.  It is served with tasty curry which is the result of the careful cooking procedure. Ban Pradok is a muban (village in Thai) in Muen Wai Sub-District, Mueang Nakhon Ratchasima District, Nakhon Ratchasima Province. This village has produced boiled rice noodles for a long time. Presently, they are available in restaurants lining both sides of the road in Ban Khok Phai area. The noodles are also served with other dishes such as Pad mi Korat (stir-fried noodles like Pad thai), Som tam (spicy papaya salad), Kai yang (grilled chicken), and desserts.

Khanom chin Lom Sak is  a famous noodles of Lom Sak District, Phetchabun Province, northern Thailand. Local people here are very popular eating noodles, because their ancestors are of Lao descent. It is said that they eat three main meals per day. There are a lot of  restaurants lining the roads. Rice noodles here are colorful, made from various herbs, it is unique not like other noodles.

Similar dishes
Khao poon  also called Lao laksa, kapoon, and khao pun. Khao poon is a popular type of spicy Lao "rice vermicelli" (rice noodles, sticky rice) soup from Laos. Khao poon is available in Thailand, Malaysia, Indonesia, Singapore, and the United States. The main ingredients of khao poon are minced chicken, fish, or pork and seasoned Lao ingredients, for example fish sauce, lime leaves, galangal, garlic, shallots, Lao chilies, and perilla. Khao poon usually in two versions which are "khao poon nam prik" (with coconut milk) and "khao poon nam jaew" (without coconut milk). Khao poon is always served with shredded cabbage, carrots, and banana blossoms with bean sprouts.

Mohinga is a rice noodle and fish soup from Myanmar which is usually served for breakfast. The main ingredients of mohinga are catfish, vermicelli noodle, fish sauce, fish pâté, ginger, banana stem, lemongrass, onions, garlic, and chickpea flour. It is an essential part of Myanmar cuisine. Fish used for making stock is often fried and added to the soup upon serving.

Bún or Vietnamese rice noodle varieties, such as Bún chả, a dish of grilled pork and noodles. The main ingredients of bun cha are rice vermicelli, grilled pork, and fresh herbs. Bun cha is served with white noodles, grilled fatty pork, and herbs as a side dish.

Num banhchok is a popular noodle soup dish in Cambodia. The dish consists of rice noodles topped with a cool fish gravy and crisp raw vegetables including cucumbers, banana blossom, water lily stems, and fresh herbs, such as basil and mint.

See also
 Idiyappam
 List of Thai dishes
 List of Thai ingredients
 Rice noodles

References

External links

 Making Fermented Rice Flour Noodles

Thai noodles
Rice dishes
Fermented foods
Mon people